A number of artists have achieved number-one singles and albums simultaneously on the Billboard charts in the United States. The list includes only those charting on the primary top singles/songs and top albums charts, presently the Billboard Hot 100 and the Billboard 200.

List of qualifying artists

1940s 
Bing Crosby – "Bing Crosby" and Merry Christmas on December 8, 1945 (one week)
Vaughn Monroe – "Let It Snow! Let It Snow! Let It Snow!" and On The Moon-Beam on January 26, 1946 (four weeks)

1950s 
Mario Lanza – "Be My Love" and The Toast of New Orleans on March 10, 1951 (one week)
Elvis Presley – "Heartbreak Hotel" / "I Was the One" and Elvis Presley on May 5, 1956  (eight and six weeks, respectively)
Elvis Presley – "(Let Me Be Your) Teddy Bear" / "Loving You" and Loving You on July 29, 1957 (five weeks)
Elvis Presley – "Jailhouse Rock" / "Treat Me Nice" and Elvis' Christmas Album on December 16, 1957 (one week)

1960s 
Elvis Presley – "Are You Lonesome Tonight?" and G.I. Blues on December 5, 1960a (one week) and December 19, 1960a (three weeks)
Bert Kaempfert – "Wonderland by Night" and Wonderland by Night on January 16, 1961a (one week)
Elvis Presley – "Good Luck Charm" and Blue Hawaii on April 21, 1962a (two weeks)
Ray Charles – "I Can't Stop Loving You" and Modern Sounds in Country and Western Music on June 23, 1962a (two weeks)
Stevie Wonder – "Fingertips and Recorded Live: The 12 Year Old Genius on August 24, 1963 (one week)
The Singing Nun – "Dominique" and The Singing Nun on December 7, 1963 (four weeks)
The Beatles – "I Want to Hold Your Hand" and Meet the Beatles! on February 15, 1964 (five weeks)
The Beatles – "She Loves You" and Meet the Beatles! on March 21, 1964 (2 weeks)
The Beatles – "Can't Buy Me Love and Meet the Beatles! on April 4, 1964 (one week)
The Beatles – "Can't Buy Me Love" and The Beatles' Second Album on May 2, 1964 (one week)
The Beatles – "Love Me Do" and The Beatles Second Album on May 30, 1964 (one week)
The Beatles – "A Hard Day's Night" and A Hard Day's Night on August 1, 1964 (two weeks)
The Beatles – "I Feel Fine" and Beatles '65 on January 9, 1965 (one week)
The Beatles – "Help!" and Help! on September 11, 1965 (two weeks)
The Beatles – "We Can Work It Out" and Rubber Soul on January 8, 1966 (two weeks)
SSgt. Barry Sadler – "Ballad of the Green Berets" and Ballad of the Green Berets on March 5, 1966 (four weeks)
The Mamas & the Papas – "Monday, Monday" on If You Can Believe Your Eyes and Ears on May 21, 1966 (one week)
The Monkees – "I'm a Believer and The Monkees on December 31, 1966 (six weeks)
The Monkees – "I'm a Believer" and More of The Monkees on February 11, 1967 (one week)
The Beatles – "All You Need is Love" and Sgt. Pepper's Lonely Hearts Club Band and August 19, 1967 (one week)
The Monkees – "Daydream Believer" and Pisces, Aquarius, Capricorn & Jones Ltd. on December 2, 1967 (four weeks)
The Beatles – "Hello, Goodbye" and Magical Mystery Tour on January 6, 1968 (two weeks)
Paul Mauriat – "Love is Blue" and Blooming Hits on March 2, 1968 (two weeks)
Simon & Garfunkel – "Mrs. Robinson" and Bookends on June 1, 1968 (two weeks)
Simon & Garfunkel – "Mrs. Robinson" and The Graduate on June 15, 1968 (one week)
The Beatles – "Come Together" and Abbey Road on November 29, 1969 (one week)

1970s 
Simon & Garfunkel – "Bridge over Troubled Water" and Bridge over Troubled Water on March 7, 1970 (five weeks)
The Beatles – "The Long and Winding Road" and Let It Be on June 13, 1970 (two weeks)
George Harrison – "My Sweet Lord" / "Isn't It a Pity" and All Things Must Pass on January 2, 1971 (three weeks)
Janis Joplin – "Me and Bobby McGee" and Pearl on March 20, 1971 (two weeks)
The Rolling Stones – "Brown Sugar" and Sticky Fingers on May 29, 1971 (two weeks)
Carole King – "It's Too Late" / "I Feel the Earth Move" and Tapestry on June 19, 1971 (six weeks)
Carole King – "You've Got a Friend" and Tapestry on July 31, 1971 (one week)
Rod Stewart – "Maggie May" / "Reason to Believe" and Every Picture Tells a Story on October 2, 1971 (four weeks)
Sly and the Family Stone – "Family Affair" and There's a Riot Goin' On on December 18, 1971 (one week)
Don McLean – "American Pie" and American Pie on January 22, 1972 (three weeks)
Neil Young – "Heart of Gold" and Harvest on March 18, 1972 (one week)
America – "A Horse With No Name" and America on March 25, 1972 (three weeks)
Roberta Flack – "The First Time Ever I Saw Your Face" and First Take on April 29, 1972 (four weeks)
Carly Simon – "You're So Vain" and No Secrets on January 13, 1973 (two weeks)
Wings – "My Love" and "Red Rose Speedway" on June 2, 1973 (three weeks)
George Harrison – "Give Me Love (Give Me Peace on Earth)" and Living in the Material World on June 30, 1973 (one week)
The Rolling Stones – "Angie" and Goats Head Soup on October 20, 1973 (one week)
John Denver – "Sunshine on My Shoulders" and John Denver's Greatest Hits on March 30, 1974 (one week)
Wings – "Band on the Run" and Band on the Run on June 8, 1974 (one week)
Gordon Lightfoot – "Sundown" and Sundown on June 29, 1974 (one week)
Olivia Newton-John – "I Honestly Love You" and If You Love Me, Let Me Know on October 12, 1974 (one week)
John Lennon – "Whatever Gets You thru the Night" and Walls and Bridges on November 16, 1974 (one week)
Elton John – Lucy in the Sky with Diamonds" and Elton John's Greatest Hits on January 4, 1975 (two weeks)
Ohio Players – "Fire" and Fire on February 8, 1975 (one week)
Linda Ronstadt – "You're No Good" and Heart Like a Wheel on February 15, 1975 (one week)
Average White Band – "Pick Up the Pieces and AWB on February 22, 1975 (one week)
Earth, Wind & Fire – "Shining Star" and That's the Way of the World on May 24, 1975 (one week)
Wings – "Listen to What the Man Said" and Venus and Mars on July 19, 1975 (one week)
Eagles – "One of These Nights" and One of These Nights on August 2, 1975 (one week)
Elton John – "Island Girl" and Rock of the Westies on November 8, 1975 (two weeks)
Wings – "Silly Love Songs" and Wings at the Speed of Sound on June 18, 1976 (three weeks)
Barbra Streisand – "Evergreen (Love Theme from A Star Is Born)" and A Star is Born on March 5, 1977 (three weeks)
Eagles – "Hotel California" and Hotel California on May 7, 1977 (one week)
Fleetwood Mac – "Dreams" and Rumours on June 18, 1977 (one week)
Bee Gees – "Stayin' Alive" and Saturday Night Fever on February 4, 1978 (three weeks)
Bee Gees – "Night Fever" and Saturday Night Fever on March 18, 1978 (eight weeks)
Frankie Vallie – "Grease" and Grease: The Original Soundtrack from the Motion Picture on August 26, 1978 (two weeks)
Donna Summer – "MacArthur Park" and Live and More on November 11, 1978 (one week)
Rod Stewart – "Da Ya Think I'm Sexy" and Blondes Have More Fun on February 10, 1979 (three weeks)
Bee Gees – "Tragedy" and Spirits Having Flown on March 24, 1979 (two weeks)
The Doobie Brothers – "What a Fool Believes" and Minute by Minute on April 14, 1979 (one week)
Donna Summer – "Hot Stuff" and Bad Girls on June 16, 1979 (one week)
Donna Summer - "Bad Girls" and Bad Girls on July 14, 1979 (four weeks)
The Knack – "My Sharona" and Get the Knack on August 25, 1979 (three weeks)
Eagles – "Heartache Tonight" and The Long Run on November 10, 1979 (one week)

1980s 
Billy Joel – "It's Still Rock and Roll to Me" and Glass Houses on July 19, 1980 (one week)
Queen – "Another One Bites the Dust" and The Game on October 4, 1980 (three weeks)
Barbra Streisand – "Woman in Love" and Guilty on October 25, 1980 (two weeks)
Kenny Rogers – "Lady" and Kenny Rogers' Greatest Hits on December 13, 1980 (two weeks)
John Lennon – "(Just Like) Starting Over" and Double Fantasy on December 27, 1980 (five weeks)
REO Speedwagon - "Keep on Loving You" and Hi Infidelity on March 21, 1981 (one week)
Kim Carnes – "Bette Davis Eyes" and Mistaken Identity on June 27, 1981 (four weeks)
The J. Geils Band – "Centerfold" and Freeze Frame on February 6, 1982 (four weeks)
Vangelis – "Chariots of Fire" and Chariots of Fire on May 8, 1982 (one week)
Paul McCartney – "Ebony and Ivory" and Tug of War on May 28, 1982 (three weeks)
Men at Work – "Down Under" and Business as Usual on January 15, 1983 (three weeks)
Michael Jackson – "Billie Jean" and Thriller on March 5, 1983 (seven weeks)
Michael Jackson – "Beat It" and Thriller on April 30, 1983 (three weeks)
The Police – "Every Breath You Take" and Synchronicity on July 23, 1983 (six weeks)
Lionel Richie – "All Night Long (All Night)" and Can't Slow Down on December 3, 1983 (one week)
Michael Jackson – "Say Say Say" and Thriller on December 24, 1984 (four weeks)
Prince - "When Doves Cry" and Purple Rain on August 4, 1984 (one week)
Prince and the Revolution – "Let's Go Crazy" and Purple Rain on September 29, 1984 (two weeks)
Wham! – "Careless Whisper" and Make It Big on March 2, 1985 (one week)
Phil Collins – "One More Night" and No Jacket Required on March 30, 1985 (two weeks)
USA for Africa – "We Are the World" and We Are the World on April 27, 1985 (two weeks)
Phil Collins – "Sussudio" and No Jacket Required on July 6, 1985 (one week)
Tears for Fears – "Shout" and Songs from the Big Chair on August 3, 1985 (one week)
Dire Straits – "Money for Nothing" and Brothers in Arms on September 21, 1985 (three weeks)
Jan Hammer – "Miami Vice Theme" and Miami Vice on November 9, 1985 (one week)
Mr. Mister – "Kyrie" and Welcome to the Real World on March 1, 1986 (one week)
Whitney Houston – "The Greatest Love of All" and Whitney Houston on May 17, 1986 (three weeks)
Madonna – "Papa Don't Preach" and True Blue on August 16, 1986 (two weeks)
Boston – "Amanda" and Third Stage on November 8, 1986 (two weeks)
Bon Jovi – "Livin' on a Prayer" and Slippery When Wet on February 14, 1987 (three weeks)
U2 – "With or Without You" and The Joshua Tree on May 16, 1987 (three weeks)
Whitney Houston – "I Wanna Dance With Somebody (Who Loves Me)" and Whitney on June 27, 1987 (two weeks)
Los Lobos – "La Bamba" and La Bamba on September 12, 1987 (one week)
Michael Jackson – "Bad" and Bad on October 24, 1987 (two weeks)
Bill Medley and Jennifer Warnes – "(I've Had) The Time of My Life" and Dirty Dancing on November 28, 1987 (one week)
George Michael – "Father Figure" and Faith on February 27, 1988 (two weeks)
George Michael – "One More Try" and Faith on May 28, 1988 (two weeks)
Debbie Gibson – "Lost in Your Eyes" and Electric Youth on March 11, 1989 (two weeks)
Madonna – "Like a Prayer" and Like a Prayer on April 22, 1989 (three weeks)
Prince – "Batdance" and Batman on August 5, 1989 (one week)
New Kids on the Block – "Hangin' Tough" and Hangin' Tough on September 9, 1989 (two weeks)
Milli Vanilli – "Girl I'm Gonna Miss You" and Girl You Know It's True on September 23, 1989 (two weeks)
Janet Jackson – "Miss You Much" and Janet Jackson's Rhythm Nation 1814 on October 28, 1989 (one week)
Milli Vanilli – "Blame It on the Rain" and Girl You Know It's True on November 25, 1989 (two weeks)
Billy Joel – "We Didn't Start the Fire" and Storm Front on December 16, 1989 (one week)
Phil Collins – "Another Day in Paradise" and ...But Seriously on December 30, 1989 (two weeks)

1990s 
Paula Abdul – "Opposites Attract" and Forever Your Girl on February 10, 1990 (three weeks)
Sinéad O'Connor – "Nothing Compares 2 U" and I Do Not Want What I Haven't Got on April 28, 1990 (three weeks)
New Kids on the Block – "Step by Step" and Step by Step on June 30, 1990 (one week)
Mariah Carey – "Someday" and Mariah Carey on March 9, 1991 (two weeks)
Paula Abdul – "Rush Rush" and Spellbound on June 15, 1991 (one week)
Michael Jackson – "Black or White and Dangerous on December 14, 1991 (four week)
Kris Kross – "Jump" and Totally Krossed Out on May 23, 1992 (one week) and June 6, 1992 (one week)
Whitney Houston – "I Will Always Love You" and The Bodyguard on December 12, 1992 (twelve weeks)
Janet Jackson – "That's the Way Love Goes and janet on June 5, 1993 (five weeks)
Mariah Carey – "Hero" and Music Box on December 25, 1993 (three weeks)
Ace of Base – "The Sign" and The Sign on April 2, 1994 (one week)
Boyz II Men – "I'll Make Love to You and II on September 17, 1994 (two weeks), October 8, 1994 (one week), and October 29, 1994 (three weeks)
Mariah Carey – "Fantasy" and Daydream on October 21, 1995 (three weeks)
Mariah Carey – "One Sweet Day" and Daydream on December 30, 1995 (three weeks)
The Notorious B.I.G. – "Hypnotize" and Life After Death on May 3, 1997 (one week)
Puff Daddy – "I'll Be Missing You" and No Way Out on August 9, 1997 (one week) and August 23, 1997 (one week)
Puff Daddy – "Mo Money Mo Problems" and No Way Out on August 30, 1997 (one week)
Celine Dion – "My Heart Will Go On" and Titanic: Music from the Motion Picture on February 28, 1998 (two weeks)
Britney Spears – "...Baby One More Time" and ...Baby One More Time on January 30, 1999 (one week)
Ricky Martin – "Livin' la Vida Loca" and Ricky Martin on May 29, 1999 (one week)
Santana – "Smooth" and Supernatural on October 30, 1999 (three weeks)

2000s 
Madonna – "Music" and Music on October 7, 2000 (one week)
Shaggy – "Angel" and Hot Shot on March 31, 2001 (one week)
Janet Jackson – "All for You" and All for You on May 12, 2001 (one week)
Ja Rule – "I'm Real (Murder Remix)" and Pain Is Love on October 20, 2001 (two weeks)
Jennifer Lopez – "Ain't It Funny (Murder Remix)" and J to tha L–O! The Remixes on March 9, 2002 (one week)
Ashanti – "Foolish" and Ashanti on April 20, 2002 (three weeks)
Nelly - "Hot in Herre" and Nellyville on July 13, 2002 (three weeks)
Nelly – "Dilemma" and Nellyville on August 31, 2002 (one week)
Eminem – "Lose Yourself" and 8 Mile on November 16, 2002 (two weeks) and January 11, 2003 (two weeks)
50 Cent – "In Da Club" and Get Rich or Die Tryin' on March 22, 2003 (three weeks)
Beyoncé – "Crazy in Love" and Dangerously in Love on July 12, 2003 (one week)
OutKast – "Hey Ya!" and Speakerboxxx/The Love Below on January 10, 2004 (two weeks) and January 31, 2004 (two weeks)
Usher – "Yeah!" and Confessions on April 10, 2004 (five weeks)
Usher – "Burn" and Confessions on May 22, 2004 (three weeks) and June 19, 2004 (one week)
50 Cent – "Candy Shop" and The Massacre on March 19, 2005 (six weeks)
Mariah Carey – "We Belong Together" and The Emancipation of Mimi on June 18, 2005 (one week)
Kanye West – "Gold Digger" and Late Registration on September 17, 2005 (two weeks)
Ne-Yo – "So Sick" and In My Own Words on March 18, 2006 (one week)
Nelly Furtado – "Promiscuous" and Loose on July 8, 2006 (one week)
Justin Timberlake – "SexyBack" and FutureSex/LoveSounds on September 30, 2006 (two weeks)
Avril Lavigne – "Girlfriend" and The Best Damn Thing on May 5, 2007 (one week)
Alicia Keys – "No One" and As I Am on December 1, 2007 (one week)
Leona Lewis – "Bleeding Love" and Spirit on April 26, 2008 (one week)
T.I. – "Live Your Life" and Paper Trail on October 18, 2008 (one week)
The Black Eyed Peas – "Boom Boom Pow" and The E.N.D. on June 27, 2009 (one week)
The Black Eyed Peas – "I Gotta Feeling" and The E.N.D. on July 11, 2009 (one week)

2010s 
Kesha – "Tik Tok" and Animal on January 23, 2010 (one week)
Eminem – "Love the Way You Lie" and Recovery on July 31, 2010 (two weeks) and August 28, 2010 (two weeks)
Adele – "Rolling in the Deep" and 21 on May 21, 2011 (3 weeks) and June 25, 2011 (one week)
Adele – "Someone Like You" and 21 on November 5, 2011 (one week)
Adele – "Set Fire to the Rain" and 21 on February 4, 2012 (two weeks)
Rihanna – "Diamonds" and Unapologetic on December 8, 2012 (one week)
Robin Thicke – "Blurred Lines" and Blurred Lines on August 17, 2013 (one week)
Taylor Swift – "Shake It Off" and 1989 on November 15, 2014 (two weeks)
Taylor Swift – "Blank Space" and 1989 on November 29, 2014 (one week), December 13, 2014 (two weeks), and January 3, 2015 (two weeks)
Wiz Khalifa and Charlie Puth – "See You Again" and Furious 7: Original Motion Picture Soundtrack on April 25, 2015 (one week)
The Weeknd – "Can't Feel My Face" and Beauty Behind the Madness on September 26, 2015 (one week)
The Weeknd – "The Hills" and Beauty Behind the Madness on October 3, 2015 (one week)
Adele – "Hello" and 25 on December 12, 2015 (six weeks)
Rihanna – "Work" and Anti on April 2, 2016 (one week)
Drake – "One Dance" and Views on May 21, 2016 (one week) and June 4, 2016 (seven weeks)
Ed Sheeran – "Shape of You" and ÷ on March 25, 2017 (two weeks)
Kendrick Lamar – "Humble" and Damn on May 6, 2017 (one week)
Camila Cabello – "Havana" and Camila on January 27, 2018 (one week)
Drake – "Nice for What and Scorpion on July 14, 2018 (one week)
Drake – "In My Feelings" and Scorpion on July 21, 2018 (four weeks)
Travis Scott – "Sicko Mode" and Astroworld on December 8, 2018 (one week)
Ariana Grande – "7 Rings" and Thank U, Next on February 23, 2019 (two weeks)
Lady Gaga and Bradley Cooper – "Shallow" and A Star is Born on March 9, 2019 (one week)

2020s 
Roddy Ricch – "The Box" and Please Excuse Me for Being Antisocial on January 18, 2020 (one week), February 8, 2020 (one week), and February 22, 2020 (one week)
The Weeknd – "Blinding Lights" and After Hours on April 4, 2020 (two weeks) and April 25, 2020 (one week)
Taylor Swift – "Cardigan" and Folklore on August 8, 2020 (one week)
BTS - "Life Goes On" and Be on December 5, 2020 (one week)
Taylor Swift - "Willow" and Evermore on December 26, 2020 (one week)
Justin Bieber - "Peaches" and Justice on April 3, 2021 (one week)
Drake - "Way 2 Sexy" and Certified Lover Boy on September 18, 2021 (one week)
Taylor Swift - "All Too Well (Taylor's Version)" and Red (Taylor's Version) on November 27, 2021 (one week)
Adele - "Easy on Me" and 30 on December 4, 2021 (three weeks)
Carolina Gaitán, Mauro Castillo, Adassa, Rhenzy Feliz,Diane Guerrero, Stephanie Beatriz and the Encanto cast - "We Don't Talk About Bruno" and Encanto (Original Motion Picture Soundtrack) on February 5, 2022 (five weeks)
Future - "Wait for U" and I Never Liked You on May 14, 2022 (one week)
Harry Styles - "As It Was" and Harry's House on June 4, 2022 (two weeks)
Drake - "Jimmy Cooks" and Honestly, Nevermind on July 2, 2022 (one week)
Beyoncé - "Break My Soul" and Renaissance on August 13, 2022 (one week)
Taylor Swift - "Anti-Hero" and Midnights on November 5, 2022 (two week) and November 26, 2022 (three weeks)
Morgan Wallen - "Last Night" and One Thing at a Time on March 18, 2023 (one week)

Notes 
 a – These albums charted at number-one on the mono albums Billboard chart.

List Inclusions 
 Original singles with associated soundtracks featuring various artists that top their collective charts are included here.
 All artists who are officially namechecked in song credits are listed here; this includes one-time pairings of otherwise solo artists and those appearing as "featuring".
 Double A-sides are counted as one number-one single.
 Paul McCartney's hits with Wings are credited to "Wings" even though many of them were released as "Paul McCartney & Wings".
 "We Are the World" is credited to "USA for Africa", and not the individual artists who participated in the recording.
 Artists who hit number one prior to the start of the Hot 100 and Billboard 200 are included here.
 A song that topped multiple pre-Hot 100 charts is counted only once.

See also 
 List of artists who have achieved simultaneous number-one UK Single and Album
 List of artists who reached number one in the United States
 List of Billboard 200 number-one albums
 List of Billboard number-one singles

References

External links 
Official Billboard website

Lists of artists by record chart achievement
United States-related lists of superlatives
Billboard charts